Jamie Thomas Parker is the member of the New South Wales Legislative Assembly representing Balmain for the Greens since 2011. Parker was the first Green to represent his party in the New South Wales Legislative Assembly.

Political career
Parker has been active in social justice and environmental issues for many years and while at university was elected the NSW president and subsequently the national environment officer of the National Union of Students.

Parker stood for and was elected to Leichhardt Council in 1999 as a NSW Greens member. Parker was subsequently re-elected in 2004 and 2008. While on Council he has served as chair of the Environment Committee, as deputy mayor and, since 2008, as the mayor of Leichhardt. He retired from Council at the 2012 election.

Parker has served as the convenor (state party chairman) of the NSW Greens.

Parker won the seat of Balmain from Labor's Verity Firth at the 2011 State election. He is the first member of the NSW Greens to sit in the Lower House of the New South Wales Parliament.

Parker announced that he would not be contesting the 2023 State election on 14 October 2022.

References

External links
 Jamie Parker for Balmain
 
 

Year of birth missing (living people)
Living people
Australian Greens members of the Parliament of New South Wales
Mayors of Leichhardt
Members of the New South Wales Legislative Assembly
Macquarie University alumni
English emigrants to Australia
People from Wellingborough
21st-century Australian politicians